|}

The Prix Miesque is a Group 3 flat horse race in France open to two-year-old thoroughbred fillies. It is run at Maisons-Laffitte over a distance of 1,400 metres (about 7 furlongs), and it is scheduled to take place each year in late October or early November.

History
The event is named after Miesque, a successful French-trained filly in the late 1980s. It was established in 2001, and the inaugural running was won by Contemporary.

The Prix Miesque replaced the Prix Saint-Roman, a race last staged in 2000. Its predecessor was traditionally contested by juveniles of either gender, but was restricted to fillies in its last three years.

Records
Leading jockey (4 wins):

 Christophe Soumillon – Contemporary (2001), Topeka (2011), Lacarolina (2013), Aboulie (2015)

Leading trainer (3 wins):
 Criquette Head-Maarek – Dalna (2003), Quiet Royal (2005), Magic America (2006)
 David Smaga – Modern Look (2007), Stefer (2008), Lixirova (2009)
 Frédéric Rossi - Izalia (2010), Ameenah (2014), Dream And Do (2019)

Leading owner:
 Jean-Claude Seroul – Izalia (2010), Ameenah (2014)

Winners

See also
 List of French flat horse races

References

 Racing Post:
 

 france-galop.com – A Brief History: Prix Miesque.
 galopp-sieger.de – Prix Miesque.
 ifhaonline.org – International Federation of Horseracing Authorities – Prix Miesque (2019).
 pedigreequery.com – Prix Miesque – Maisons-Laffitte.

Flat horse races for two-year-old fillies
Maisons-Laffitte Racecourse
Horse races in France
Recurring sporting events established in 2001
2001 establishments in France